The 2017 UCI BMX World Championships was the 22nd edition of the UCI BMX World Championships, and took place at the Novant Health BMX Supercross Track in Rock Hill, South Carolina, United States from July 25 to 29, 2017.

In contrast to the 2016 edition, only four medal events were held.

Medal summary

Elite events

Junior events

Medal table

References

External links

UCI BMX World Championships
UCI BMX World Championships
Cycling competitions in the United States
International sports competitions hosted by the United States
Rock Hill, South Carolina
UCI BMX World Championships
UCI BMX World Championships